Brule Lake or Brûlé Lake or Lac Brûlé or Lac Brulé may refer to one of nine lakes in Ontario, Canada:

Brule Lake (Frontenac County)
Nipissing District
Brûlé Lake (Stewart Township)

See also
Brule Lake (disambiguation)